Allen Bonshaca Lamont Rossum (born October 22, 1975) is a former American football cornerback and return specialist. He was drafted by the Philadelphia Eagles in the third round of the 1998 NFL Draft. He played college football at Notre Dame.

Rossum also played for the Green Bay Packers, Atlanta Falcons, Pittsburgh Steelers, San Francisco 49ers and Dallas Cowboys. He was a Pro Bowl selection in 2004. Rossum was one of the most consistent returners in the league during his 12-year career. That consistency put him in the top five of all-time return leaders. During his career he ranked first among active players in both punt and kickoff return yards.  He is the only player in NFL history to have a kickoff return for a touchdown with five different teams.

Early years
Rossum attended Skyline High School in Dallas, Texas, where he played option quarterback, receiver and tailback in addition to returning kicks and playing defensive back.  He recorded 580 tackles and 13 interceptions.  He also rushed for 1,634 yards and had 12 touchdown receptions as a senior.

Track and field
Rossum was an accomplished track star as well, captaining his high school team all four years and setting the 1993 HS record in the 100m with a 10.02.

Personal bests

College career
Rossum was recruited by every school in the former Southwest Conference.   He accepted a scholarship from the University of Notre Dame, where he became a starter for the Fighting Irish football team during his sophomore year and served as one of three senior captains in 1997.  During his career there, he set an NCAA career record with nine touchdown returns (three interceptions, three punts and three kickoffs).  As a cornerback, he tallied seven interceptions, 144 tackles, two sacks and 12 passes defensed.  He also ran for the Irish track team, becoming a two-time All-American competing in the 55-meter dash.  Rossum graduated early from Notre Dame with a dual degree in business and computer applications.

Professional career

Philadelphia Eagles
Rossum was drafted by the Philadelphia Eagles in the third round (85th overall) of the 1998 NFL draft. Rossum set Eagles single-season records for kickoff returns (54) and kickoff return yds (1,347), while ranking 4th in NFC (and 5th in the NFL) with a 24.9 avg. He was selected as the special teams MVP by his teammates. Tallied 12 tackles and 2 PDs at CB, adding a career-high 17 special teams stops and ranking 7th in conference with an 8.9 avg. on 28 punt returns in addition to an 86-yd. return to earn NFC Special Teams Player of the Week. In his rookie season shared punt return duties with Freddie Solomon, Jr., returning 22 for 187 yds. (8.5 avg.).

He played two seasons with the Eagles as a return specialist and backup cornerback. During his career with the Eagles, he returned 50 punts for 437 yards and 98 kickoffs for 2,427 yards with one returned for a touchdown (an 89-yard return against the Washington Redskins).

Green Bay Packers
Rossum was acquired by the Green Bay Packers for an undisclosed draft pick in 2000 and spent two seasons with the team, during which he returned 40 punts for 357 yards and one touchdown (a 55-yard return against the Tampa Bay Buccaneers), and returned 73 kickoffs for 1,719 yards and one touchdown (a 92-yard return against the Indianapolis Colts) and was named NFC Special Teams Player of the Week for his efforts.

Atlanta Falcons
After two seasons with the Packers, he signed with the Atlanta Falcons as an unrestricted free agent and became the team's all-time leader in kickoff and punt return yardage.  In 2003, he led the NFL with 545 punt return yards.  Rossum won the NFL's "fastest man" competition at the 2005 Pro Bowl, where he also made his first appearance for the NFC squad as a kick returner, replacing injured Eddie Drummond of the Detroit Lions.  In his five seasons with Atlanta, he returned 154 punts for 1,723 yards and two touchdowns (one a 59-yard return against the Tennessee Titans, another a 75-yard return against the Kansas City Chiefs), and returned 250 kickoffs for 5,489 yards and one touchdown (a 91-yard return against the Seattle Seahawks). During the 2004 season, Rossum also recorded two interceptions as a cornerback and set a playoff record in a win against the St. Louis Rams with 152 punt return yards on just three returns, an average of 50.7 yards per return, including a touchdown where he faked a lateral to DeAngelo Hall.

Pittsburgh Steelers
In 2007, Rossum was traded to the Pittsburgh Steelers for a 2008 conditional draft pick, but was released after one season.  He returned 36 punts for 232 yards, and returned 38 kickoffs for 885 yards and one touchdown (a 98-yard return against the San Francisco 49ers).

San Francisco 49ers
Rossum signed with the San Francisco 49ers on February 29, 2008.  The 49ers used him primarily as a kick returner, although he occasionally played as a receiver during the season, scoring a rushing touchdown on a reverse against the Detroit Lions – the first rushing touchdown of his career. Rossum became the first 49ers defensive back to score an offensive touchdown since Dicky Moegle in 1955 (December 11, 1955, vs. Baltimore Colts). He returned 15 punts for 223 yards, and returned 47 kickoffs for 1,259 yards and a touchdown (a 104-yard return, the longest of his NFL career, against the Arizona Cardinals on a Monday Night Football game). Rossum finished sixth in the NFL and third in the NFC with a 26.8 average on kickoff returns and a 14.9 yard average on punt returns. Due to his strong performance, he was named a second alternate returner for the 2009 Pro Bowl.

An unrestricted free agent in the 2009 offseason, Rossum was re-signed by the 49ers on February 27, 2009. 
He recorded his 300th career punt return in a game against the Seattle Seahawks, but was ultimately released on October 12, 2009, to make room on the roster for rookie Michael Crabtree.

Dallas Cowboys
Rossum was signed by the Dallas Cowboys on October 13, 2009. The Cowboys had not used a return specialist in quite some time, and Rossum took over for Felix Jones and Patrick Crayton on kick and punt return duties, an area where the Cowboys had had trouble in the past.

Rossum suffered an injury on his first play as a member of the Dallas Cowboys. In his absence, Patrick Crayton returned two punts for touchdowns. Rossum was waived on November 23.

NFL career statistics
Defensive Stats

Return Stats

Rushing and Receiving Stats

Rossum's Highs
Tackles  8 Atl (9-13-98)
Kick Returns 8 Ind (11-19-00)
Kick Returns-Yds. 222 Wash (11-14-99)
Punt Returns 5 Phi (9-17-00)
Punt Returns-Yds. 68 T.B (11-14-01)

NFL records
 Most punt return yards in a playoff game: 152 (2004 vs St. Louis Rams)

Eagles franchise records
 Most kickoff returns in a single season: 54 (1999)
 Most kickoff return yards in a single season: 1,347 (1999)

Falcons franchise records
 Most Career Punt Return Yards (1,723)
 Most Career Kickoff Return Yards (5,489)
 Most career All-Purpose yards (7,212)
 Most career punt return touchdowns (2) (tied with Deion Sanders, Tim Dwight)
 Most career kickoff returns (250)
 Most career punt returns (154)

Personal life
Rossum and his wife have four children. He won the National Fatherhood Award in 2005. He established the Allen Rossum Healthy Kids Foundation and hosts an annual Allen Rossum Golf Tournament.

References

External links

Allen Rossum at Pro-Football Reference
Allen Rossum "Healthy Kids" Foundation

1975 births
Living people
People from Dallas
Players of American football from Texas
American football cornerbacks
American football return specialists
National Conference Pro Bowl players
Notre Dame Fighting Irish football players
Notre Dame Fighting Irish men's track and field athletes
Philadelphia Eagles players
Green Bay Packers players
Atlanta Falcons players
Pittsburgh Steelers players
San Francisco 49ers players
Dallas Cowboys players